Junggaroperadectes is an extinct genus of peradectine metatherian which existed in Keziletuogayi Formation, China during the early Oligocene. It was first named by Xijun Ni, Jin Meng, Wenyu Wu and Jie Ye in 2007 and the type species is Junggaroperadectes burqinensis.

References

Prehistoric metatherians
Fossil taxa described in 2007
Oligocene mammals of Asia